The 1973 Tipperary Senior Hurling Championship was the 83rd staging of the Tipperary Senior Hurling Championship since its establishment by the Tipperary County Board in 1887.

Roscrea were the defending champions.

Roscrea won the championship after a 3-14 to 3-08 defeat of Kilruane MacDonaghs  in the final at Semple Stadium. It was their fifth championship title overall and their second title in succession.

Results

Quarter-finals

Semi-finals

Final

References

Tipperary
Tipperary Senior Hurling Championship